Chessie Racing (also AV-Teknik) is a yacht. She finished sixth in the 1997–98 Whitbread Round the World Race skippered by George Collins.

Career
Chessie Racing was designed by Bruce Farr and built by Eric Goetz Custom Boats.

References

Volvo Ocean Race yachts
Sailing yachts of the United States
Sailing yachts of Croatia
Volvo Ocean 60 yachts
Sydney to Hobart Yacht Race yachts
1990s sailing yachts